Serena Rees MBE (born 14 March 1968) is a British entrepreneur, founder, fashion designer, and public speaker. She founded Agent Provocateur with her then husband Joseph Corré in 1994 and Les Girls Les Boys in 2017.

Early life
Rees was adopted at an early age by Indian parents. She was working as a model in Chelsea, in 1992 when she met  Joseph Corré, the son of Vivienne Westwood and Malcolm McLaren.

Agent Provocateur
Rees decided to open a lingerie store that would be filled with colourful and fashion-forward lingerie. The store opened in 1994 on Broadwick Street, Soho as a retail shop. Eventually Rees and Corre began designing their own line of lingerie as well.

Agent Provocateur became a well known brand selling in 13 different countries and over 30 stores. Rees maintained a strict confidentiality policy which allowed celebrity clients to feel comfortable purchasing the products. Rees made sure to cater to a celebrity clientele by enforcing a strict confidentiality policy. The brand often features celebrity models such as Kate Moss.

Rees and Corre sold Agent Provocateur to private equity house 3i for £60m, as part of their divorce settlement.

Les Girls Les Boys
Les Girls Les Boys is a men’s and women’s underwear, intimates and streetwear brand, founded by Serena Rees in May 2017.

Other business ventures
Rees then started Cocomaya, a bakery and chocolatier with several branches in London, where she resides with her daughter and partner Simonon.

References

Living people
British businesspeople
1968 births